Rosman Sulaiman (born 6 November 1982) is a Singaporean footballer who plays for S.League side, Woodlands Wellington.

He is a versatile player who is able to play in a variety of positions across the backline, as well in as the left, right or centre of midfield.

Club career

Prior to joining his present club, Woodlands Wellington, Rosman has played for S.League clubs Marine Castle, Tanjong Pagar United, Young Lions and most recently Home United. He also had a loan spell at NFL side, Police Sports Association.

As he plays mostly in defense, Rosman has only scored three goals despite chalking up more than 200 appearances in the S.League.

Two of these goals came from the time where he was still playing for Tanjong Pagar United against Clementi Khalsa on 27 March 2002 and Sembawang Rangers on 23 May 2002.

In addition to that, he has one Home United league goal to his name while playing against SAFFC on 21 August 2009.

Rosman has appeared in several matches in the AFC Cup while playing for the Protectors. He captained the team twice during Home United's back to back wins against Maldivian side, Club Valencia in the 2009 AFC Cup Group Stage.

He also has a goal to his name in the 2008 AFC Cup, in which he scored from 30 yards against Dempo SC in the first leg of the 2008 AFC Cup quarter-finals on 16 September 2008.

He made his debut for Woodlands Wellington on 21 February 2013 in a 2–2 draw against Warriors F.C. and scored his first goal for the Rams on 5 March 2013 against his former club, Home United, with a free kick from his own half which evaded the entire Protectors' defence.

His impressive performances for Woodlands Wellington has led a call up to the Singapore Selection side which will face Atlético Madrid in the Peter Lim Charity Cup, an exhibition match which will be held on 22 May 2013.

Club career statistics

Rosman Sulaiman's Profile

All numbers encased in brackets signify substitute appearances.

Appearances in AFC Cup Competitions

Goals in AFC Champions League / AFC Cup competitions

International career
Rosman has made over ten appearances for the Singapore national team so far, primarily in the 2011 AFC Asian Cup Qualifiers.

International appearances

References

External links

data2.7m.cn

1982 births
Living people
Singaporean footballers
Singapore international footballers
Home United FC players
Hougang United FC players
Tanjong Pagar United FC players
Woodlands Wellington FC players
Singapore Premier League players
Association football defenders
Young Lions FC players